Ateş Çınar (born 16 May 1986) is a Turkish yacht racer competing in the 470 class. He studied at Dokuz Eylül University. His brother Deniz is also a national sailor.

He became Turkish champion in the Laser 4.7 class at the Turkish Sailing Championships in 2002 and 2003, and won the 2002 Turkish Sailing Foundation Trophy in the same class. He gained the silver medal at the Laser 4.7 World Championships held off Çeşme, Turkey.

Ateş Çınar represented his country in the 470 class event at the 2008 Summer Olympics along with his brother Deniz Çınar. Both qualified again for participation at the 2012 Summer Olympics, where Deniz was the skipper.

Achievements

References

External links
 
 
 

1986 births
Living people
Turkish male sailors (sport)
Olympic sailors of Turkey
Sailors at the 2008 Summer Olympics – 470
Sailors at the 2012 Summer Olympics – 470
Sailors at the 2016 Summer Olympics – 470
Sailors at the 2020 Summer Olympics – 470
Extreme Sailing Series sailors
Dokuz Eylül University alumni
Sportspeople from İzmir